Viliame Seruvakula is a former Fijian military officer who played an instrumental role in the aftermath of the Fiji coup of 2000.

He attended Ratu Sukuna Memorial, Queen Victoria and Lelean Memorial Schools. He was a member of the Deans Trophy winning Lelean Under-19 Team side that defeated Ratu Kadavulevu School in the Fiji Secondary Schools Rugby Union (FSSRU) competition finals in 1979. The 1979 Lelean Under-19 team's battle cry was "sink the Bismarck"

Seruvakula joined the army in the early 1980s.  He opposed the 2000 coup, and when rebels from the Counter Revolutionary Warfare Unit mutinied at Suva's Queen Elizabeth Barracks on 2 November 2000, he led the third infantry battalion in a counter-offensive to retake the barracks from the rebels.

Following the mutiny, Seruvakula made some controversial statements in the media.  He alleged that he had been offered F$250,000 to support George Speight's attempted coup in May, and that former Prime Minister Sitiveni Rabuka (who led two coups in 1987) had incited the mutiny and attempted to overthrow the military commander, Commodore Frank Bainimarama. His police statement became the subject of several investigations.

Seruvakula, now a lieutenant colonel, resigned from the military in early 2006 to take up a post with the Peace and Security division of the United Nations.
His father, Ratu Semi Seruvakula, is a retired school principal. Viliame was commissioned as an officer in New Zealand. He served in Lebanon and Sinai. He was in Lebanon from 1986 to 1987 as a platoon commander in the Charlie company of the First Battalion, Fiji Infantry Regiment.

References

Year of birth missing (living people)
Living people
People educated at Lelean Memorial School
Fijian soldiers
People educated at Queen Victoria School (Fiji)
Fijian expatriates in New Zealand
Fijian expatriates in Lebanon
I-Taukei Fijian people